Paranal Observatory is an astronomical observatory operated by the European Southern Observatory (ESO). By total light-collecting area, it is the largest optical-infrared observatory in the Southern Hemisphere; worldwide, it is second to the Mauna Kea Observatory on Hawaii.

The Very Large Telescope (VLT), the largest telescope on Paranal, is composed of four separate  telescopes. In addition, the four main telescopes can be used simultaneously for extra light gathering capacity, and for interferometry. Four auxiliary telescopes of  each are also part of the VLTI to make it available when the main telescopes are being used for other projects. The site also houses two survey telescopes with wide fields of view, the  VISTA and the  VLT Survey Telescope for surveying large areas of the sky; and two arrays of small telescopes called NGTS and SPECULOOS which are dedicated to searching for exoplanets.

Two major new facilities are under construction nearby: the southern part of the Cherenkov Telescope Array gamma-ray telescope (not owned by ESO) will be sited in the grounds 10 km south-east of Paranal; while ESO's future E-ELT will be on the nearby peak of Cerro Armazones 20 km east of Paranal, and will share some of the base facilities.

Telescopes

Aerial view 

From an aerial view of the Paranal Observatory, the four large units of the VLT with their four small, dome-shaped auxiliary telescopes can be clearly seen. The Survey Telescope, VST, is immediately adjacent to the VLT and seen in between two of its units, while VISTA is located on a secondary peak, some 1,500 m away in the background (see image).

Very Large Telescope 

The Very Large Telescope (VLT) consists of four 8.2-metre telescopes operating in the visible and infrared. These telescopes, along with four smaller auxiliary telescopes, are also combined to operate as an optical interferometer on certain nights of the year. All of the 8.2-metre telescopes have adaptive optics and a full suite of instruments.

VISTA Survey Telescope 

VISTA is the Visible & Infrared Survey Telescope for Astronomy, a 4.0-metre telescope with a wide field of view, focusing on infrared surveys of the sky. It was built close to ESO's VLT by a consortium of 18 universities from the United Kingdom, led by Queen Mary University of London. VISTA was handed over to the European Southern Observatory in December 2009.

VLT Survey Telescope (VST) 

The VLT Survey Telescope or VST is a 2.6-metre telescope with a wide field imager intended to aid the four Very Large Telescope (VLTs) in their scientific aims.

Next-Generation Transit Survey (NGTS)  

The Next-Generation Transit Survey (NGTS) is an exoplanet-survey facility located a few kilometers from the main peak. It consists of an array of twelve 0.2-meter robotic telescopes with a very large field of view of 96 square degrees or several hundred times the area of the full moon. The survey aims to discover numerous super-Earths and Neptune-sized planets around nearby stars, using transit photometry to detect them. NGTS is managed by a partnership of seven academic institutions from Chile, Germany, Switzerland and the United Kingdom and its design is based on the SuperWASP project. Science operations began in early 2015.

SPECULOOS Southern Observatory (SSO) 

The SPECULOOS Southern Observatory (SSO) consists out of four telescopes, called Europa, Io, Callisto, and Ganymede. ESO hosts the 1-meter telescopes and the project is led by the University of Liège. The project aims to find exoplanets around ultracool dwarf stars and brown dwarfs. The project builds on the success of the TRAPPIST telescope. The telescopes are located next to the NGTS.

Other buildings 

As well as the telescopes, control buildings and maintenance facilities, Paranal has a Residencia which provides accommodation for staff and visitors. This is located 200 m lower and 3 km from the telescopes. It is built half into the mountain with the concrete coloured to blend into the landscape. It has gym facilities, a swimming pool, a restaurant and two gardens. The construction was decorated by the Chilean architect Paula Gutiérrez Erlandsen, Marchioness of la Pica.

Gallery

Popular culture and other uses 

The VLT hotel, the Residencia, served as a backdrop for part of the 2008 James Bond film Quantum of Solace.

The observatory's facilities were used to stage the Pacific Alliance's fourth summit in June 2012, formally launching the organization.

On 14 March 2013, Frederik, Crown Prince of Denmark, accompanied by his wife, Princess Mary, visited ESO's Paranal Observatory, as part of an official visit to Chile. Their tour of Paranal's astronomical facilities was led by ESO's Director General, Tim de Zeeuw.

See also 

 Very Large Telescope
 List of largest optical reflecting telescopes
 List of astronomical observatories
 List of highest astronomical observatories
 Other observatories in Chile:
 Llano de Chajnantor Observatory 
Atacama Large Millimeter Array
 Cerro Armazones Observatory
 Extremely Large Telescope
 La Silla Observatory
 Cerro Tololo Inter-American Observatory
 European Northern Observatory
 VVV Survey

References

External links
 European Southern Observatory homepage
Paranal Observatory homepage
Visits to the Paranal Observatory
 
 Photo gallery of ESO Paranal Observatory

Astronomical observatories in Chile
Atacama Desert
Buildings and structures in Antofagasta Region
European Southern Observatory
Articles containing video clips